In enzymology, a maltose O-acetyltransferase is an enzyme that catalyzes the chemical reaction

acetyl-CoA + maltose  CoA + 6-O-acetyl-alpha-D-glucopyranosyl-(1->4)-D-glucose

Thus, the two substrates of this enzyme are acetyl-CoA and maltose, whereas its two products are CoA and [[6-O-acetyl-alpha-D-glucopyranosyl-(1->4)-D-glucose]].

This enzyme belongs to the family of transferases, specifically those acyltransferases transferring groups other than aminoacyl groups.  The systematic name of this enzyme class is acetyl-CoA:maltose O-acetyltransferase. Other names in common use include maltose transacetylase, maltose O-acetyltransferase, and MAT.

Structural studies

References

 
 
 

EC 2.3.1
Enzymes of known structure